The 1986 FIBA Africa Championship for Women was the 10th FIBA Africa Championship for Women, played under the rules of FIBA, the world governing body for basketball, and the FIBA Africa thereof. The tournament was hosted by Mozambique from December 17 to 27, 1986.

Zaire ended the round-robin tournament with a 4–0 unbeaten record to win their second title.

Participating teams

Schedule

Final standings

Awards

External links
Official Website

References

1986
1986 in women's basketball
1986 in African basketball
Bask
International women's basketball competitions hosted by Mozambique